Francis-Xavier Kojo Sosu (born 12 February 1979) is a Ghanaian Lawyer and politician. He is a member of the National Democratic Congress (NDC). He is currently a member of the 8th parliament of the 4th Republic of Ghana representing the Madina Constituency. He is also Deputy Ranking Member of the Constitutional, Legal and Parliamentary Affairs Committee of Parliament.

Early life and education 
He is a native of Denu in the Volta Region but was born in Accra New Town. He attended St John's Grammar Senior High School. Sosu holds a Bachelor of Arts (BA) (Honors) in Sociology from the University of Ghana and a Bachelor of Law (LLB) also from the  University of Ghana. He further proceeded to the Ghana School of Law for the Professional Certificate to practice law and was called to the Bar in October 2010. Sosu holds a master's degree in Oil and Gas Law (LLM) from the University of Ghana. He also has a Master of Arts (MA) degree in Economic Policy Management, from the Economics Department of University of Ghana and a Master of Philosophy (MPhil) in Conflict, Human Rights and Peace Studies from University of Education, Winneba.

Career 
Sosu is a lawyer by profession. He started as a legal counsel at Logan & Associates before setting up F-X Law & Associates, a progressive Human Rights and Public Interest Law firm in Accra in 2012, which he currently serves as the Managing Partner.

Politics

Parliamentary bid 
Sosu was elected as the National Democratic Congress candidate for the Madina Constituency for the 2020 parliamentary Elections after getting  661 votes to beat his closest contender Sidii Abubakar, a former National Youth Organizer for the party, who polled 480 votes. Ibrahim Hussein Faila came third with 217 votes with Hajia Rukaya also getting only 16 votes. In November 2015, he lost narrowly in a similar primary against the then incumbent Amadu Bukari Sorogho. Sosu polled 1,486 votes as against the 1,738 votes polled by Sorogho who had been representing the constituency since 2005 but eventually lost to Abu-Bakar Saddique Boniface.

In the 2020 Elections, Sosu beat the incumbent member of parliament, Abu-Bakar Saddique Boniface the former Minister for Zongo and Inner City Development by getting 62,127 votes against his 46,985 votes to be declared member of parliament elect for the Madina Constituency.

Member of Parliament 
Sosu was sworn in as Member of Parliament representing the Madina Constituency in the 8th Parliament of the 4th Republic of Ghana on 7 January 2021. He serves as a member on the Constitutional, Legal and Parliamentary Affairs Committee and the Appointments Committee of Parliament.

Personal life 
Sosu is married to Felicia Adwoa Konadu Sosu and together they have 4 children: first daughter named Marita Klenam Pokua Sosu and two sons, Francis-Xavier Kadi Sosu (Jnr) and Ian-Xavier Eli Sosu. The name of their last daughter is Mia Gayra Ahenkan Sosu.

References

External links 

 Official Twitter page

Living people
National Democratic Congress (Ghana) politicians
Ghanaian human rights activists
21st-century Ghanaian lawyers
People from Volta Region
Ewe people
Ghanaian MPs 2021–2025
1979 births
University of Ghana alumni
University of Education, Winneba alumni